Kenisha Pascal is a Grenadian middle- and long-distance runner. She set the Grenadian national record  for the half marathon in 2003 with a time of 2:14.18. After winning three Gold and one Silver medal at the 2016, Kenisha was awarded the Veda Bruno Award for most outstanding female at the OECS Championship. On 4 November 2018 Kenisha  won the second leg of the South American 10K which was held in Guyana.

Competition record

External links
All-athletics profile

References

Living people
Grenadian female middle-distance runners
Year of birth missing (living people)